Maninho (born 30 March 1991) is a Mozambican international footballer.

International career

International goals
Scores and results list Mozambique's goal tally first.

References

External links

Living people
Association football forwards
Mozambican footballers
Mozambique international footballers
1991 births
Liga Desportiva de Maputo players
Mozambique A' international footballers
2014 African Nations Championship players